"House Keeper" is the debut single by American R&B group Men of Vizion, released in 1996 from their debut studio album Personal. Co-written by group member George Spencer III, the song was their only appearance on the Billboard Hot 100, peaking at No. 67 in 1996.

Music video

The official music video for the song was directed by Jesse Vaughan.

Chart positions

References

External links
 
 
 Lyrics of this song ("House Keeper")

1995 songs
1996 debut singles
Men of Vizion songs
MJJ Music singles
Song recordings produced by Teddy Riley
Songs written by Teddy Riley